The 2005 GP Ouest-France was the 69th edition of the GP Ouest-France cycle race and was held on 28 August 2005. The race started and finished in Plouay. These are the results, in which American George Hincapie edged out AG2R's Alexandre Usov.

General Standings

References

External links
Race website

2005 UCI ProTour
2005
2005 in French sport
August 2005 sports events in France